Srijan Pal Singh is an Indian author, public speaker and social entrepreneur. He was born and raised in Lucknow, Uttar Pradesh.

Singh is an electrical engineer from the Institute of Engineering & Technology, Lucknow and a management graduate from the Indian Institute of Management Ahmedabad (IIMA). He worked closely with the Former President of India Dr A. P. J. Abdul Kalam. Apparently, A.P.J. Abdul Kalam's lasts words were also said to Mr Singh, 'Funny guy, are you doing well?'.

At IIMA,  he engaged in a variety of social and developmental activities and was elected as the President of the Students' Union in 2008–09.

Career

Singh is one of the leading young activists in India. Between 2009 and 2015, Singh worked with Dr A. P. J. Abdul Kalam (11th President of India), as his Officer-on-Special-Duty and Advisor for Technology and Policy. He was engaged in promoting various assignments such as "What Can I Give Movement", Energy Independence for the nation, nuclear and space missions, and Providing Urban Amenities to Rural Areas.

He has co-authored the bestseller book with Dr. Kalam titled, Target 3 Billion which recommends innovative solutions towards sustainable development of the rural areas of the world. The idea of PURA evolved from the book was taken up as a major national program by Government of India in association with many Indian corporate in a Private-Public-Partnership Model. He has co-Authored two more books with Dr. Kalam titled "Reignited: Scientific Pathways to a Brighter Future" and "Advantage India: From Challenge to Opportunity".

In 2012, Singh and Dr. A.P.J. Abdul Kalam and  founded the Kalam Foundation where Singh was appointed as the Managing Director with Dr. Kalam as the Chairperson. After the demise of Dr. Kalam, Singh continued the visions of the 11th President by running the Dr. APJ Abdul Kalam Centre, where he is now the CEO. For his commitment to the missions of Dr. Kalam, he is often regarded as the intellectual successor of Dr. Kalam. He is also a member of the Research Board of the Deendayal Research Institution founded by Nanaji Deshmukh. He is also the co-founder of the Mars Mission India Project to develop an awareness of space technologies in Indian youth and he leads a Mars simulation mission from India.

He has been appointed as a Mentor to Uttar Pradesh Startup Policy  and a Member for Innovations on Maharashtra Water Resource Regulatory Authority.

Singh has also authored Excellence in Management, published by UNDP, which is a study of best practices in management of Public Sector Organizations in developing world, specifically the Delhi Metro Rail Corporation. In 2017, he wrote the best-seller book, The Black Tiger which was launched by Anna Hazare.

He also takes lectures on community action, leadership and development in Indian Institute of Management Ahmedabad and Indian Institute of Management Indore. He is a public speaker and have spoken at various events including various TEDx Events, Australia India Youth Dialogue and has contributed to leading national newspapers like Rajasthan Patrika, Times of India, BusinessWorld and The Hindu. In 2014, he was appointed as the Member of the Expert team of Shyama Prasad Mukherji RURBAN Mission by Government of India.

In 2014, he co-founded the initiative, Barefoot IT. Barefoot IT was envisaged with the key goal to empower people at the bottom of the pyramid by creating a platform that brings together technology, policy makers and other key stakeholders through active problem identification and analysis so as to come up with innovative solutions. e-Spandana which was launched under Barefoot IT for connecting rural masses with its elected representatives (GP, ZP Members, MLA, MP) to identify and overcome problems and issues faced collectively. It is an initiative to take Government to the doorstep of rural masses.

Singh launched a book on smart cities named as "Smart and Human: Building Cities of Wisdom" on 16 March 2015 which was India's first book on building smart cities in Indian way.

Singh was appointed a Mentor to the Uttar Pradesh State Startup Policy in 2016, a fund of Rs. 10 billion dedicated to promoting entrepreneurship in India's largest state.

In 2019, he awarded the LMA Leadership Award for Innovations by the Lucknow Management Association.

Further details

From Nov 2011 to Nov 2012, Singh was instrumental in starting a youth movement with Dr Kalam, called What Can I Give Mission, which reached a network of over 500,000 volunteers from across India, both rural and urban who are working towards a clean, green and corruption free India.

He has worked in the corporate world as a Management Consultant with the Boston Consulting Group - a global management consulting firm and the world's leading advisor on business strategy. There he worked with the World Food Program on improving governance and transparency in Public Distribution System in Naxal affected areas of Orissa.

Books And publications 

 Target 3 Billion by A. P. J. Abdul Kalam and Srijan Pal Singh | Publisher Penguin Books
 Khushhal Va Samridh Vishwa by A. P. J. Abdul Kalam and Srijan Pal Singh | Publisher Prabhat Prakashan
 Delhi Metro : Excellence in Management by Samar K. Datta; Biju Varkkey; Srijan Pal Singh; and Suyog Nankar | Publisher UNDP
 Smart and Human Building Cities of Wisdom by Srijan Pal Singh and G.R.K. Reddy | Publisher Harper Collins India
 A Perspective on Fisheries Sector Interventions for Livelihood Promotion]
 Education in the Australia-India Relationship
 Assessing Impacts of Bandhan's Micro-credit and Related Development Interventions
 Reignited: Scientific Pathways to a Brighter Future
 Advantage India: From Challenge to Opportunity
 What Can I Give? Life Lessons from my Teacher
Black Tiger: Defeating India's Corrupted
Reignited 2: Emerging Technologies of Tomorrow

References

Businesspeople from Lucknow
Indian Institute of Management Ahmedabad alumni
Living people
Writers from Lucknow
Year of birth missing (living people)